Robin Judah (18 June 1930 – 12 August 2021) was a British sailor. He competed in the Dragon event at the 1968 Summer Olympics. Judah died on 12 August 2021, at the age of 91.

References

External links
 

1930 births
2021 deaths
British male sailors (sport)
Olympic sailors of Great Britain
Sailors at the 1968 Summer Olympics – Dragon
Sportspeople from Kolkata